Mikael Ström was a professional football player. He was born on 1 February 1977. He played for IFK Norrköping between 2001 and 2004 and scored 4 goals. His first goal came against AIK.

References

External links
https://www.svenskafans.com/fotboll/15051.aspx

1972 births
Living people
Swedish footballers

Association footballers not categorized by position